The twenty-cent piece was a Canadian coin struck by Royal Mint for the Province of Canada, in 1858. It consisted of 92.5% silver, and 7.5% copper. A total of 730,392 were struck.

History

With the passing of the Currency Act on 1 August 1854, the Province of Canada introduced a decimal currency. Coins were struck in 1, 5, 10 and 20 cent denominations. The new Canadian dollar was equal in value to the New Brunswick dollar, which was introduced in 1852.

In order to accommodate transactions involving the Nova Scotian pound, the Province of Canada chose to issue a twenty-cent coin, which was the equivalent to a shilling in Nova Scotian currency. However, no shilling coin was issued by Nova Scotia, and the British shilling was worth 20 percent more than a Nova Scotian shilling. The twenty-cent coin was confused with both British shillings and American quarters, and was therefore not minted beyond 1858.  The Dominion of Canada withdrew the coins from circulation and from 1885 on returned them to the Royal Mint to be recoined as 25-cent pieces.

Varieties

There are several known varieties of the twenty-cent coin, primarily involving the letter I on the obverse in the words VICTORIA, GRATIA, or DEI. The majority of twenty-cent coins have a coinage alignment, however approximately one-quarter were struck with a medal alignment.

References

Coins of Canada
Twenty-cent coins